Stereum is the type genus of the Stereaceae family of fungi, in the Russulales order. Until recently, the genus was classified in the Corticiaceae family, of the Corticiales order. However, it was given its own family as a result of the split-up of the Corticiales. Common names for species of this genus include leaf fungus, wax fungus, and shelf fungus. Fungi having a shape similar to a Stereum are said to have a stereoid shape. Stereum contains 27 species that have a widespread distribution.

Habitat
Stereum species are found to live on all kinds of deadwood or hardwood or dead leaves (they are therefore said to be saprobic). Sometimes they are also found on living leaves.

Characteristics
Stereum species are wood decay fungi. Their simple, shelving fruiting bodies have a smooth hymenium, lacking gills or tubes. Like most members or the family Stereaceae, Stereum fruiting bodies lack clamp connections and produce amyloid basidiospores.

The species can be divided into two groups: the bleeders (those that exude a red liquid from cut surfaces, similarly to Lactarius species) and the non-bleeders (those that do not). In 1959, Zdenek Pouzar created a distinct genus, Haematostereum, for the bleeding species of Stereum, including H. gausapatum, H. rugosum, and H. sanguinolentum. Modern authors do not consider Haematostereum to be a distinct genus, so it is currently treated as a synonym of Stereum.

Species

There are numerous species in this genus (and family), the most common one being Stereum hirsutum.

Stereum acanthophysatum
Stereum adnatum
Stereum albostipitatum
Stereum alternum
Stereum antarcticum
Stereum aotearoa
Stereum aratum
Stereum armeniacum
Stereum auriscalpium
Stereum aurora
Stereum avellanaceum
Stereum azonum
Stereum bagliettoanum
Stereum beigehymenium
Stereum bellum
Stereum bombycinum
Stereum boninense
Stereum braunii
Stereum burtiasmum
Stereum burtissimum
Stereum campaniforme
Stereum carthusianum
Stereum complicatum
Stereum cupulatum
Stereum durum
Stereum earlei
Stereum elongatum
Stereum fasciatum
Stereum gausapatum
Stereum hirsutum
Stereum illudens
Stereum insignitum—may be considered a synonym of Stereum subtomentosum
Stereum ostrea -- False turkey tail. Sometimes considered a variety of *Stereum hirsutum.
Stereum papyrinum—Preferred name: Lopharia papyrina
Stereum purpureum -- Silver leaf fungus. Preferred name: Chondrostereum purpureum 
Stereum rugosum
Stereum sanguinolentum
Stereum subtomentosum
Stereum taxodii—Preferred name: Laurilia taxodii

References

Fungal tree pathogens and diseases
Russulales genera
Stereaceae